The Aparados da Serra National Park is a national park located in the Serra Geral range of Rio Grande do Sul and Santa Catarina states in the south of Brazil, between 29º07’—29º15’ S and 50º01’—50º10’ W. It was created in 1959 as one of Brazil's first national parks, to protect the Itaimbezinho canyon. It extends over an area of 10,250 hectares.

Flora and fauna
Despite its relatively small size, the park is characterised by a rich biodiversity, as result of its diverse relief and of being situated at the contact between coastal forests, grasslands and Araucaria moist forests. There have been at least 143 bird, 48 mammal, and 39 amphibian species documented in the park.

Endangered fauna on the plateaus of the park include the red-spectacled amazon parrot, the maned wolf, and the cougar. On the slopes, the neotropical otter, ocelot and the brown howling monkey can be found.

Conservation and threats
When created in 1959, the national park protected an area of 13,000 ha. This has been reduced to 10,250 ha in 1972 through a presidential decree. In 1992 adjoining the national park, the new Serra Geral National Park has been created, encompassing an additional 17,300 ha. However, according to the Duke University's Center for Tropical Conservation, the current park area, even after the extension with Serra Geral National Park, is still too small to be effective for the protection of representative samples of each distinct environment.

One of the main obstacles for conservation efforts is that the state only has title over 67.5% of the land, and even part of that is occupied by farmers. Raising cattle, the practice of using fire to "renew" grasslands, the establishment of banana plantations with associated use of pesticides and the presence of domestic animals, all contribute to environmental degradation. Other threats are posed by invasive flora from the areas surrounding the park and poaching.

Currently a maximum of 1,500 visitors per day are allowed in the park.

References

External links 

Duke University ParksWatch: profile of Aparados da Serra NP

National parks of Brazil
Protected areas of Rio Grande do Sul
Protected areas of Santa Catarina (state)
Protected areas of the Atlantic Forest